Orthetrum rubens, or the Elusive Skimmer,  is a species of dragonfly in the family Libellulidae. It is endemic to South Africa.  Its natural habitat is rivers. It is threatened by habitat loss.

References

External links
Orthetrum rubens on African Dragonflies and Damselflies Online

Libellulidae
Insects of South Africa
Taxonomy articles created by Polbot
Insects described in 1937